Munizaga Peak is an ice-free peak (2590 m) located 3 nautical miles (6 km) east-southeast of Misery Peak in the Roberts Massif, Queen Maud Mountains. Mapped by United States Geological Survey (USGS) from surveys and U.S. Navy air photos, 1960–65. Named by Advisory Committee on Antarctic Names (US-ACAN) for Fernando Munizaga Sørensen, Chilean geologist who participated in the United States Antarctic Research Program (USARP) Ellsworth Land Survey, 1968–69, and accompanied the Texas Technological College geological party in a survey of Roberts Massif in the same season.

Mountains of the Ross Dependency
Dufek Coast